|}

The Lightning Novices' Chase is a Grade 2 National Hunt steeplechase in Great Britain which is open to horses aged five years or older. It is run at Doncaster over a distance of about 2 miles and half a furlong (2 miles and 78 yards, or 3,290 metres), and during its running there are twelve fences to be jumped. The race is for novice chasers, and it is scheduled to take place each year in late January or early February.

The race was first run in 1979 and was formerly held at Ascot, contested over a distance of 2 miles. It was switched to alternative venues for a three-year period beginning in 2005, and it returned to Ascot with a distance of 2 miles and 1 furlong in 2008. The race was transferred to Doncaster in 2010, and at the same time its length was cut by 110 yards.

Winners

See also
 Horse racing in Great Britain
 List of British National Hunt races

References
 Racing Post:

 pedigreequery.com – Lightning Novices' Chase.

National Hunt races in Great Britain
Doncaster Racecourse
National Hunt chases
Recurring sporting events established in 1979
1979 establishments in England